Nehalem may refer to:

 Nehalem (people), or Tillamook, a Native American tribe
 Nehalem language, or Tillamook language, the language spoken by the Nehalem (Tillamook) tribe

Places

Oregon, United States
 Nehalem Bay, a bay in Tillamook County
 Nehalem Bay State Airport, an airport near Nehalem Bay
 Nehalem Bay State Park, a state park which includes Nehalem Spit and Nehalem Beach
 Nehalem Highway, a state highway
 Nehalem, Oregon, a city in Tillamook County
 Nehalem River, a river

Other uses
 Nehalem (microarchitecture), an Intel processor microarchitecture